Lake Gaillard in North Branford, Connecticut, began during the 1920s, when the New Haven Water Company (which is now South Central Connecticut Regional Water Authority) started buying land in North Branford from the area of Totoket Mountain to what is now known as Sea Hill Road, with the intention of building a reservoir. "The regional water authority currently owns 34.9% (6,000 out of 17,000 sq acres) of the land within North Branford, most of these holdings surrounds Lake Gaillard, the largest reservoir within the Regional Water Authority’s water supply."

In 1926 the construction of Lake Gaillard began.  The building of Lake Gaillard took over 7 years and was finished in 1933. "Lake Gaillard had cut off any eastern access between the two ends of town and the road to North Guilford. The lake also covered 22 homes and farms. Many of the construction workers who came to build this massive project settled in town, further increasing the population."

The man-made lake is over 1.5 miles long by over a mile wide at its largest points.  In comparison to the Town of North Branford the reservoir is massive, making up over 20% of the town area, all of which is private and not open to the public. "Currently the lake provides water for more than 500,000 customers of the Regional Water Authority."

The reservoir provides drinking water for much of New Haven County. "Lake Gaillard reservoir in North Branford is part of the South Central Connecticut Regional Water Authority’s (RWA) system which stores water for future use to the towns of North Branford, Branford, East Haven, North Haven and part of New Haven.  After this stored water is sent to its designated water treatment plant for processing, it is then distributed into the RWA’s public water line system."

References 

Gaillard
Protected areas of New Haven County, Connecticut
North Branford, Connecticut
Gaillard
1933 establishments in Connecticut